Redditch railway station serves the town of Redditch, North Worcestershire, England. The station, and all trains serving it, are operated by West Midlands Trains. The line used to continue south to Ashchurch and also Evesham but this was closed in the 1960s.

History
The Redditch Railway opened on 18 September 1859 but was operated from the start by the Midland Railway.

There were intermediate stations between Redditch and Evesham at Studley and Astwood Bank, Coughton,  (for the Stratford-upon-Avon and Midland Junction Railway), Salford Priors, and Harvington.

British Railways (BR) closed the line south of Alcester on 29 September 1962 after suspending the passenger service between Redditch and Evesham due to poor track condition. Freight services continued between Redditch and Alcester until 1964 when BR closed the whole line south of Redditch. The remaining line from Redditch to Barnt Green was nearly closed under the Beeching Axe, which would have severed the town from the railway network entirely. But a strong campaign by local residents and local MPs managed to save it. However, by the late 1960s, services to Redditch had been cut to the bare minimum with just four daily trains to and from Birmingham. This persisted until 1980, when an hourly service was extended to Redditch on the newly upgraded Cross-City Line. This was upgraded to half-hourly in 1989.

The station has been relocated three times, on 4 May 1868, 7 February 1972 and 5 October 1992. The movement of the station was to give way to redevelopment in the town centre and the building of a new bus station. The most recent rebuilding of the station in 1992 coincided with the electrification of the Cross-City Line. The first station was in Clive Road when the original Redditch Railway was opened in 1859. The station moved to the site that is now the bus station when the railway was extended to Evesham in 1868.

Some of the former goods yard that was on Pound Meadow is now the car park to current station but most of the yard has been redeveloped into housing and a hotel.

The single track from Barnt Green restricted the number of trains that could run to Redditch to two per hour. The line between Barnt Green and Redditch was closed for eight weeks for the works to be carried out, and was reopened on 1 September 2014. The improved service began in December 2014.

Stationmasters

Isaac Brooks until 1864
Thomas Diggles 1864 - 1873
W. Clifford 1873 - 1875
John Daniel Sibley 1875 - 1879 (afterwards a coal merchant)
Zephaniah Ping 1879 - 1885 (afterwards station master at Wisbech)
G. Smith 1885 - 1888 (incapacitated due to blindness)
William Horton 1888 - 1892
William Mann 1892 - ca. 1914 
J.W. Griffin from 1920 (formerly station master at Rowsley)
Charles Ratcliffe 1931 - 1940 (formerly station master at Loughborough)
G. Richards from 1942 
W.R. Richards 
Charles Blakeman ca. 1954 ca. 1956
W.L. Mann from 1960 (formerly station master at Bridgnorth)

Facilities
The station is staffed and has a booking office as well as a ticket machine. Step-free access is available for wheelchair users.  There is also a shop available for passengers selling newspapers, food and drinks.  Train running information is offered via digital CIS displays, automated announcements, timetable poster boards and a customer help point.

Services

Trains run every 30 minutes to  via Birmingham New Street. On Sundays a half hourly service runs through to Lichfield Trent Valley.
Services are operated by Class 323 electric multiple units.

References

Further reading

External links

Rail Around Birmingham and the West Midlands: Redditch station
Redditch Railway Stations - Redditch Model Railway Club

Redditch
Railway stations in Worcestershire
DfT Category D stations
Former Midland Railway stations
Railway stations in Great Britain opened in 1859
Railway stations in Great Britain closed in 1868
Railway stations in Great Britain opened in 1868
Railway stations in Great Britain closed in 1972
Railway stations opened by British Rail
Railway stations in Great Britain opened in 1972
Railway stations served by West Midlands Trains
1859 establishments in England